The Slayer (also known as Nightmare Island) is a 1982 American independent horror film directed by J. S. Cardone. Set on a small island near the Atlantic coast, the plot concerns two couples who upon visiting the island get trapped there due to an oncoming hurricane. As one of the women knows from her plaguing nightmares that the island is dangerous, over the next three days they begin to be killed by something unseen. The film is notable for gaining notoriety and being classified in the United Kingdom as a "video nasty" in the 1980s.

Plot
Kay is an abstract visual artist who has been plagued since childhood by a series of disturbing dreams.  The intensity and frequency of the dreams have fluctuated over the course of her life, as has their content; some of her dreams are simply of glimpses of desolate locations that leave her feeling dread upon awakening, while others feature the gruesome deaths of her friends and loved ones at the hands of a supernatural force.  Recently, her dreams have become more frequent and disturbing than ever, resulting in a shift in the quality of her work.  Afraid that the dreams are aggravated by stress and depression, and fearful that her newfound success may be slipping away, Kay's family and friends plan a vacation for her to a small island off the coast of Georgia. Accompanying Kay are her husband David; Kay's brother Eric, who introduced her to David; and Eric's wife Brooke.

As the couples' plane prepares to land, their pilot, Marsh, informs them that he's just received notification that an Atlantic hurricane has shifted course towards the island.  Marsh hurriedly drops the couple off, telling them that he has to leave the island before he's stranded there.  The couples discover that, against expectations, the island is deserted, and populated largely by derelict buildings and the ruins of a once-thriving resort town.  Kay informs the rest of the quartet that the island is the place she has been dreaming about since childhood, and that they are all in danger if they stay. Unable to leave due to the hurricane, the others try to assuage her fears.

The following evening, David is murdered by an unseen assailant, and Kay dreams of waking up next to his severed head.  That day, she finds David's decapitated body hanging in an abandoned playhouse on the island.  Eric believes that Marsh never left the island and brought the couples there to kill them, a supposition that is granted some support when Marsh is later seen on the island.  Kay believes that the island has allowed her dreams to cross over into reality, and that the creature from her nightmares is responsible; a theory supported by the fact that the deaths only occur when Kay is asleep. During the night, Eric tells Brooke about Kay being given a black kitten for Christmas as a child and that it was found frozen to death in the family freezer two days later. Kay blames the creature in her nightmares for the cat's death.

As night falls, Eric goes to retrieve flares from a boathouse, and is murdered on the beach before being dragged into the ocean.  Later, Brooke is attacked in the boathouse and impaled with a pitchfork.  After finding their bodies on the beach, Kay barricades herself in the beach house and struggles to stay awake, incessantly drinking coffee and smoking cigarettes to remain stimulated.  In the middle of the night, Marsh attempts to gain entry into the house.  Kay shoots him with a flare gun which kills him and sets the house on fire.  In the chaos, Kay discovers a flaming, skeletal creature waiting for her at the front door as she tries to flee.

As the grotesque creature approaches her, Kay (as a child) is woken up on Christmas morning by her parents, telling them that she had a nightmare. Kay's father then presents her with a black kitten, as Eric enters the room.  Kay looks at the cat and becomes visibly frightened, as she realises that the nightmare she just had wasn't just a bad dream, but was a premonition of things to come.

Cast

Analysis
The Slayer has received critical attention from film scholars and horror film enthusiasts due to its ambiguous sensibility, with part of its narrative being told in a non-chronological order, allowing for multiple mutually-exclusive interpretations supported by various elements of the script. The core events of the film which occur on the island have been noted by critics for their dubious nature, as they can alternately be interpreted in three ways: The events which take place are entirely part of a dream or premonition; a monstrous creature in fact exists on the island and is responsible for each of the murders; or the characters of Kay or Marsh are responsible for the killings. However, the script does not resolve this fundamental issue, instead referring back to itself. Additionally, each of the characters in the film foreshadow their own deaths in dialogue which occurs in the film's first act.

Production

In 1981, writer-director J.S. Cardone was working at a liquor store in Los Angeles while attempting to break into the film business, and pitched the idea for The Slayer to producer William R. Ewing. The International Picture Company, an independent film studio based in Atlanta, agreed to help produce the project on a budget of approximately $750,000.

As a result of the studio's basis in Georgia, the crew scouted areas in the state to shoot the film, settling in Tybee Island, east of Savannah, Georgia. Upon arriving at the island—which at that time was largely uninhabited and dilapidated—Cardone recalled it fit perfectly with the vision he had had for the film while writing the script. Filming took place in the winter of 1982 on Tybee Island with additional photography in Savannah.

Release
After the film's production company, The International Picture Show Company, went bankrupt, the film was acquired for distribution by 21st Century Film Corporation. It was subsequently given a brief theatrical release in October 1982, showing in New York City in an edited rough cut that had not been color-corrected. This print of the film would later be used for VHS releases in the mid-1980s.

Critical reception 
Allmovie wrote "The Slayer boasts some effectively eerie atmosphere and a dark, downbeat attitude. Unfortunately, sluggish pacing eliminates the tension that might have been established between the minimal cast and the sinister deserted-island setting." Gordon Bowker of Variety deemed The Slayer a "boring horror film for hit-and-run bookings." In his 1989 video guide The Horror Film: A Guide to More Than 700 Films on Videocassette, James Mulay notes: "Director J.S. Cardone manages to present this overly familiar material with considerable flair, considering his low budget, and the film does have a genuinely surreal, nightmarish quality."

Film historian Adam Rockoff praised the film's special effects, and called it a "straightforward, sophisticated, and unexpectedly well-acted film." Film historian John Wiley Martin called the film "a pretty modest, sub-Repulsion exercise in escalating alienation from the point of view of a troubled young woman." Scholars David Kerekes and David Slater praised the film's opening sequence and noted elements of German Expressionism present in the film, but added that the latter portion of the film paled in comparison to its opening act.

Home media
The Slayer was released in the United States on double feature video format by Continental Video alongside another feature: Scalps. It was cut by five minutes or so, in order to make room for the second feature, but all the gruesome scenes and violence are intact.

In the United Kingdom, the film was initially released uncut on pre-cert VHS format in 1983. However, it was subsequently seized and banned by the BBFC and placed on the infamous "video nasty" list in October 1983 in jurisdiction of the then upcoming Video Recordings Act 1984, which stated that all video content must carry a classification for home video releases. Films which contained extreme or excessive violence, gore or sex had to be edited to fit the 18 classification or banned outright. The Slayer was removed from the list in April 1985.

The film received a 14-second cut version by the BBFC when it was picked up by the now defunct Vipco (Video Instant Picture Company) for VHS distribution and released on March 1, 1992. This VHS would later become a collectible after going out of print, with an average resale price of $75 in 1996. On August 13, 2001, Vipco released the film complete and uncut on both VHS and DVD, from their "Vaults of Horror" collection. On October 13, 2003, Vipco again released the same uncut version on DVD-only format for their "Vipco's Screamtime Collection" which contained newly commissioned artwork that differed from all previous releases. Although the company was popular, it was also criticized for stating that their DVD releases were digitally remastered, when in fact they were simply VHS transfer prints, which unfortunately led The Slayer to remain in its cropped 4:3 aspect ratio.  Vipco's company dissolved in 2007 and distribution rights were later held by the defunct Cornerstone Media for a brief time under their subsidiary Beyond Terror, releasing the film on DVD on February 15, 2010. However, Cornerstone Media made the film available only with updated artwork; the disc itself is from Vipco's Screamtime Collection release, which is something the company did with all titles they picked up from Vipco. The inserted discs were perhaps Vipco's unsold or refurbished copies.  
 
Arrow Films released the film on dual format Blu-ray and DVD in the United Kingdom on August 21, 2017, and in the United States on August 29, 2017. The set contains a 4K transfer of the film and is available for the first time in its original aspect ratio of 1.85:1, and contains English Mono uncompressed PCM audio and English subtitles for hard-of-hearing. It includes several interviews with cast and crew members as well as three audio commentaries.

See also
Street art
Exploitation film
Horror-of-personality
Slasher film

References

Sources

Kerswell, Justin, et al. (2017). The Slayer. Audio commentary (Blu-ray). Arrow Films.

External links
 
 
 

1982 films
1982 horror films
1980s horror thriller films
1982 independent films
1980s mystery films
1980s psychological thriller films
1980s serial killer films
1980s slasher films
American slasher films
American serial killer films
Films about nightmares
Films directed by J. S. Cardone
Films scored by Robert Folk
Films set on islands
Films shot in Georgia (U.S. state)
Video nasties
21st Century Film Corporation films
1980s English-language films
1980s American films